Latif Atta Blessing (born 30 December 1996) is a Ghanaian professional footballer who plays as a midfielder or forward for Major League Soccer club New England Revolution.

Early life 
Blessing was born in Nankese, a small village in the Suhum-Kraboa-Coaltar District of southeast Ghana.

Career

Ghana
In 2013, Latif Blessing joined the Liberty Professionals youth team in Accra. He was soon promoted to the senior club for the Ghana Premier League but mainly appeared on the bench for the side. Blessing received particularly good reviews for his performance during a Premier League match against Asante Kotoko on 21 June 2015. In that match, he scored in the 21st minute to equalize before providing two assists, leading Liberty Professionals to a 3–1 victory.

During the 2016 season, Blessing scored six goals in his first eight games. After his hat-trick on the final day of the season against Bechem United, Blessing would go on to finish the season as the top scorer in the league with 17 goals. His performance during the season was recognized in December 2016 when Blessing won the best player of the league award by the Ghana Football Association.

Major League Soccer
In January 2017, Blessing signed with Sporting Kansas City of Major League Soccer. He made his MLS debut on 11 March 2017 against FC Dallas. On 24 March 2017, Blessing was loaned to Swope Park Rangers, scoring in their match against OKC Energy FC. Blessing's first MLS goals came in a brace on 13 May 2017 in a 2–2 draw in Orlando versus Orlando City. On 20 September 2017, Blessing scored in the 2017 U.S. Open Cup Final, as Sporting Kansas City won the 2017 U.S. Open Cup.

In December 2017, Blessing was selected by Los Angeles FC with the second selection of the 2017 MLS Expansion Draft. He made his debut for the club as a starter in their first MLS match, a 1–0 victory at Seattle Sounders.

On January 3, 2023, Blessing was acquired by New England Revolution in exchange for $400,000 in GAM for Los Angeles FC.

International
Blessing was included in the provisional squad for Ghana before the 2017 Africa Cup of Nations but failed to make the final cut.

Personal
Blessing holds a U.S. green card which qualifies him as a domestic player for MLS roster purposes.

Blessing's brother, Ibrahim Fuseini, currently plays for Lori FC in the Armenian Premier League. He has a twin sister, Latifa.

Career statistics

Honors
Sporting Kansas City
U.S. Open Cup: 2017

Los Angeles FC
MLS Cup: 2022
Supporters' Shield: 2019, 2022

References

External links 
 
 

1996 births
Living people
Footballers from Accra
Ghanaian footballers
Liberty Professionals F.C. players
Sporting Kansas City players
Sporting Kansas City II players
Association football forwards
Ghanaian expatriate footballers
Ghanaian expatriate sportspeople in the United States
Expatriate soccer players in the United States
Major League Soccer players
USL Championship players
Los Angeles FC players
New England Revolution players
Ghanaian twins
Ghana Premier League top scorers